Jacques Faivre (25 November 1932 – 13 August 2020) was a French professional footballer. He was born in Bourg-en-Bresse.

External links
Profile
Profile

Sportspeople from Bourg-en-Bresse
1932 births
2020 deaths
French footballers
France international footballers
FC Sochaux-Montbéliard players
Racing Besançon players
OGC Nice players
Stade Rennais F.C. players
AS Saint-Étienne players
Ligue 1 players
Ligue 2 players
Association football forwards
Footballers from Auvergne-Rhône-Alpes